Józef Rogacki (18 March 1948 - 30 October 2015) was a Polish footballer who played as a forward. His career was spent playing for teams in the Tricity area of Poland. His career was spent in the Polish second and third divisions.

Biography

Rogacki started his career playing with the youth sides of MRKS Gdańsk until 1966. He joined Lechia Gdańsk in 1967 and spent two years with the club, making a total of 14 appearances and scoring 6 goals for the club during this time in the II liga and III liga. He then spent two seasons with Flota Gdynia, before returning again to Lechia. He made a further 55 league appearances and scoring one goal over the next three seasons, and making a combined total of 73 appearances and scoring 7 goals during his time at Lechia. For the 1974–75 season he returned to the club where his footballing journey started, MRKS Gdańsk, retiring from playing football at the end of the season.

He had at least one child, a daughter called Anna who also played football. He died on 30 October 2015 and is buried in the Łostowicki cemetery.

Honours

Lechia Gdańsk
III Liga (g. IV): 1971–72

References

1948 births
2015 deaths
Lechia Gdańsk players
Polish footballers
Association football forwards
Footballers from Poznań